Thomas Emmett Dent (born January 11, 1950) is an American politician who serves as a member of the Washington House of Representatives representing the 13th Legislative District. He was elected in 2014 to the House seat vacated by Judy Warnick, who retired to run for the Washington State Senate. He is a former chairman of the Grant County Republican Party.

Dent has been a pilot since 1975, founding Tom Dent Aviation in Othello in 1977. The company moved to Moses Lake in 1984. He was appointed as a commissioner for Moses Lake Municipal Airport in 1994. He is also a cattle and bison rancher.

Awards 
 2020 Guardians of Small Business. Presented by NFIB.

Personal life
Dent has lived in Moses Lake, Washington for more than 30 years.

References

External links 
 Tom Dent at ballotpedia.org
 Tom Dent at votesmart.org

Living people
People from Moses Lake, Washington
Ranchers from Washington (state)
Republican Party members of the Washington House of Representatives
1950 births
21st-century American politicians
American flight instructors
Aviators from Washington (state)